Matar is one of the 182 Legislative Assembly constituencies of Gujarat state in India. It is part of Kheda district.

List of segments
This assembly seat represents the following segments,

 Matar Taluka - Limbasi, Sandhana, Alindra, Antroli, Asamali, Aslali, Ratanpur, Undhela, Vasal
 Kheda District (Part) Villages – Naika, Bherai, Dhathal, Vadala, Hariyala, Khumarvad, Vavdi, Damri, Govindpura, Shetra, Rasikpura, Varsang, Radhu, Chandna, Vasna Bujarg, Shandhana, Nadiad, Pij, Bherai, Bidaj, Chandna
 Nadiad Taluka (Part) Villages – Degam, Zarol, Dantali, Dabhan, Davda, Bamroli, Palana, Vaso, Rampura, Pij, Mitral, Gangapur, Navagam (Hathaj), Thaledi, Kaloli

Members of Legislative Assembly
2002 - Rakesh Rao, Bharatiya Janata Party
2007 - Devusinh Chauhan, Bharatiya Janata Party
2012 - Devusinh Chauhan, Bharatiya Janata Party
2014 (By Election) -Kesarisinh Solanki, Bharatiya Janata Party

Election results

2022

2017

See also
 List of constituencies of the Gujarat Legislative Assembly
 Kheda district
 Gujarat Legislative Assembly

References

External links
 

Assembly constituencies of Gujarat
Kheda district